The Domestic Crusaders is a play by Wajahat Ali about a Pakistani-American Muslim family.

The play made its Off-Broadway premiere at the Nuyorican Poets Café on September 11, 2009. The story is about the lives of a Pakistani-American family grappling with their own internal trials and tribulations, the changing dynamics of American society and a globalized, post-9/11 world. McSweeney's published the play in the Fall of 2010.

Summary
The play takes place over the course of one day, in an upper-middle-class suburban family home of a Muslim-American family of Pakistani origins. Six members of a Pakistani-American Muslim family, spanning three generations, reunite at the family home to celebrate the youngest son's 21st birthday.  Each individual family member, or "domestic crusader", attempts to assert his or her individual definition of self and destiny in the face of collective family and societal constraints, fears and misunderstandings.

Characters
Hakim is the grandfather, a retired Pakistani army officer
Salman is the father who oscillates between prideful exuberance and the daily grind that preys on his feelings of self-worth
Khulsoom is Salman's wife who misses her native land and struggles to impart her traditional values onto her American-raised children
Salahuddin is the eldest son who is a successful businessman
Fatima is the middle child and a social justice activist
Ghafur is the youngest child

History
Ali, who is an attorney and writer in the Bay Area, began writing the play in 2001 while studying at the University of California, Berkeley. The idea for the play came from Ali's writing professor, Ishmael Reed, who encouraged him to write a theatrical piece that shed light on the inner lives of American Muslims, an increasingly marginalized American religious community.

Ali explained his choice of the play's ironic title in the February 2011 issue of American Theatre, saying it refers to "hundreds of years of alleged inherent acrimony between the West and Islam....I wanted to reframe that within this multi-hyphenated Muslim-American family. These 'crusaders,' instead of being blood-thirsty warmongers, are nuanced, hypocritical, self-involved, quirky people. Instead of Kalashnikovs and swords and missiles, we see them fighting with stinging barbs and wit and regrets and secrets—good old-fashioned drama and melodrama."

Premiere
The two-act play officially premiered as a 2005 showcase production at the Tony Award-winning Berkeley Repertory Theatre. The play was and continued to be directed by acclaimed choreographer and director Carla Blank through 2011. Its NYC debut, on September 11, 2009, at the Nuyorican Poets Café was followed by a sold-out five-week run, which broke attendance records for plays at this landmark Off-Broadway theater.  In his Nuyorican program notes, Ali explained the choice of this date for the play's New York opening: "I believe by proactively confronting the history of that day through art and dialogue we can finally move beyond the anger, the violence, the extremism, the separatism, the pain and the regret, and build a bridge of understanding and reconciliation."

The play received its international premiere performances at MuslimFest in Mississauga, Ontario, Canada, on July 31 and August 1, 2010, and was showcased in Washington, D.C.'s Atlas Performing Arts Center on November 12, 2010, and at the Kennedy Center's Millennium Hall on November 14, 2010. The one-hour performance of Act One remains archived on the Kennedy Center website.

See also
List of cultural references to the September 11 attacks

References

External links
MSNBC Article about the play
MSNBC Interview by Pat Battle
Additional Reviews

Islam in the United States
Asian-American plays
2005 plays
Pakistani-American literature
Off-Broadway plays
American plays
Plays set in the United States
Plays about the September 11 attacks
Plays about families